The track and field competition at the 1990 Central American and Caribbean Games was held in Mexico City, Mexico.

Medal summary

Men's events

Women's events

Medal table

See also
1990 in athletics (track and field)

References

 
 
 

1990 Central American and Caribbean Games
Athletics at the Central American and Caribbean Games
C
1990 CAC Games